The Wenatchee Riverfront Railway is a  gauge miniature railway located in Wenatchee, Washington.

External links
 Railway website

Rail transportation in Washington (state)
10¼ in gauge railways in the United States